Pahardanga Union is an Union Parishad under Lohagara Upazila of Narail District in the division of Khulna, Bangladesh. It has an area of 49.05 km2 (18.94 sq mi) and a population of 12,653.

References

Unions of Kalia Upazila
Unions of Narail District
Unions of Khulna Division